Mark Alison Hatley (September 19, 1949 – July 27, 2004) was an American football player, coach, executive, and administrator who was the de facto General Manager of the Chicago Bears from 1997 to 2000. He also held positions for the Ohio State Buckeyes, Tulsa Golden Hurricane, TCU Horned Frogs, Baylor Bears, New Orleans Saints, Kansas City Chiefs, and Green Bay Packers. He also played football for the Oklahoma State Cowboys.

Early life and education
Mark Hatley was born on September 19, 1949 in Borger, Texas and went to Philips High School. He went to college at Oklahoma State and played linebacker.

College Coaching Career
Hatley became a coach for the Ohio State Buckeyes after his playing career. He also was a coach for the Tulsa Golden Hurricane, TCU Horned Frogs, and Baylor Bears.

Professional career

New Orleans Saints
In 1984 Hatley was signed by the New Orleans Saints as a Scouting and Quality Control Coach. In 1985 he was promoted to Secondary Coach.

Kansas City Chiefs
In 1987 he became the Kansas City Chiefs Linebackers Coach. He also was a Scout (1988–1991) and Director of Pro Personnel (1992–1996).

Chicago Bears
In 1997 he became the Vice President of Pro Personnel for the Chicago Bears.  He was also the de facto General Manager.

Green Bay Packers
In 2001 he became the Vice President of Football Operations for the Green Bay Packers. He was there until 2004, when he died suddenly at the age of 54.

References

1949 births
2004 deaths
New Orleans Saints coaches
Kansas City Chiefs coaches
Chicago Bears executives